Justice Quarterly is a quarterly academic journal covering criminology and criminal justice. It was established in 1982 and is published by Routledge on behalf of the Academy of Criminal Justice Sciences, of which it is an official journal. The editors-in-chief are Bryanna Fox (University of South Florida) and Marvin Krohn (University of Florida). According to the Journal Citation Reports, the journal has a 2018 impact factor of 3.214.

References

External links

Criminal law journals
Quarterly journals
Routledge academic journals
Academic journals associated with learned and professional societies
Publications established in 1982